Shahabuddin Ahmed (born 11 September 1950) is a Bangladeshi painter. He was awarded the Chevalier De L'ordre Des Arts Et Des Lettres (Knight in the Order of Fine Arts and Humanities) by the Ministry of Cultural Affair and Communication of France in 2014. He was the recipient of Independence Day Award by the Government of Bangladesh in 2000. His paintings are displayed in galleries like Olympic Museum, Lausanne, Switzerland, Municipal Museum of Bourg-en-Bresse, France, Seoul Olympic Museum, South Korea, the National Taiwan Museum and Bangladesh National Museum.

Education
Ahmed studied at Dhaka Art College (now Faculty of Fine Arts, University of Dhaka) before obtaining a scholarship to study at the École nationale supérieure des Beaux-Arts in Paris during 1974–1981.

Career
Ahmed served as a platoon commander for the Bangladesh Liberation War in 1971, before studying art, and his experiences in the war are clearly reflected in his artwork. He was member of guerilla team Crack Platoon
 He has painted numerous scenes from the war (e.g. the Killing of the Intellectuals) as well as portraits of key figures such as Sheikh Mujibur Rahman.

Ahmed's works are displayed in many galleries around the globe including the Olympic Museum of Lausanne in Switzerland, Bangladesh National Museum, Bulgarian National Museum in Sofia, Seoul Olympic Museum of South Korea and Bourg-en Bresse Museum France as well as in India, United States, and England.

Ahmed's paintings are permanently displayed in Galerie Daniel Besseiche, Galerie Samagra, Galerie du Fleuve in Paris 6ème (rue Jacob, rue de Seine, sur Guénégaud) Galerie Jas de la Rimade in south of France (Carcès near to Aix-en-Provence) Galerie Daniel Besseiche in Courchevel, Deauville and Saint-Tropez. His paintings are often sold by auction in Drouot, Artcurial, Christie's, and Versailles Enchères.

Ahmed currently lives in Paris.

Painting style
Ahmed's painting style is iconic. It stands out from the work of all his fellow Bangladeshi artists. He has a distinct oil on canvas style that is heavily influenced by European artists. It is argued that Shahabuddin is greatly inspired by European artists from the 1980s, especially that of Francis Bacon.

Ahmed's works rely on minimalism and stark realism. Despite his European style, he would always address his subject matter as something related closer to home. His works are often described as "…baroque-like figures turned towards space seeking light and energy." In his work, the subject is suspended in a mass of monochrome blank space and consists of mostly earthy tones, with perhaps one pop of color. His work is also described as "… figures [that] seem to be enthralled in the cosmic dance at times merging with the ethereal forces."

One of Ahmed's most popular work of art is the Freedom Fighter, showing a figure in motion. This is another characteristic of his works- his subjects appear to be in motion and parts of the subject is always in a blur, gently mixing in with the background. However, some parts of the subject is always distinctively in focus, so much so that you can differentiate every muscle and sinew that is present in it in perfect proportion. This is one of the aspects of Shahabuddin's art that makes him different from his fellow contemporary artists from Bangladesh. His work is described as "The imagery of fearless human figures, which are in the motion of running, seems to burst free from their skin with their flesh, blood, and sinew…"

Although much of his works are about the Liberation War, Shahabuddin has declared that he detested violence and his art was representative of the struggles that he had to overcome as someone who was involved in the war. He also has painted many portraits of important figures such as Sheikh Mujibur Rahman and Mahatma Gandhi.

Awards
2014 : Chevalier de l'ordre des Arts et des Lettres (Knight in the order of Art & Literature) Paris, France.
2000 : Independence Day Award
1992 : Olympiad of Arts "50 Master Painters of Contemporary Art" Barcelona, Spain
1986 : Honourable Mention Award, 3rd Asian Art Biennal, Dhaka, Bangladesh
1982 : Best Award in painting,"Young Artists Art Exhibition" Bangladesh Shilpakala Academy, Dhaka, Bangladesh
1981 : Gold Medal, Salon du Printemps, Paris, France
1980 : 1st Prize, Exhibition of Painters from 31 countries UNESCO, Paris, France
1975 : Gold Medal, Salon du Printemps, Paris, France
Silver Medal, Salon des Artistes Français, Paris, France

Art collections

Shahabuddin has created countless paintings. Unlike many artists, Shahabuddin has numerous paintings stored in many collections spread all over the world. There are many stored in private collections, of course. Here are some public collections of Shahabuddin's art work from various countries:
Bangobondhu Sriti Museum Dhaka, Bangladesh
Bangladesh National Museum, Dhaka, Bangladesh
National Art Gallery Bangladesh Shilpakala Academy, Dhaka, Bangladesh
Bengal Foundation, Dhaka, Bangladesh
Seoul Olympic Museum, South Korea
National Museum of Taiwan, Taiwan
National Museum of Bulgaria, Sofia, Bulgaria
Olympic Museum of Lausanne, Switzerland
Museum of Bourg-en-Bresse, France

Exhibitions
Ahmed has taken part in countless exhibitions all over the world. His work has been viewed and appreciated by people from numerous counties. His exhibitions are listed below just to give an idea of how far his work has reached.

Major solo exhibitions
1973 : College of Arts & Crafts, Dhaka, Bangladesh
1975 : Cultural Center of Groningen, Holland
       Gallery Voude-Port, Royan, France
       FIAP Art Gallery, Paris, France
1976 : Cité des Arts, Paris, France
1977 : Cultural Center, University of Varsovie, Poland
1978 : Gallery de la Maison des Beaux-Arts, Paris, France
1979 : College of Arts & Crafts, Dhaka, Bangladesh
1980 : House of Fine Arts Gallery, Paris, France
1981 : Gallery Voude-Port, Royan, France
1981 : Bangladesh Shilpakala Academy, Dhaka, Bangladesh
1983 : Bangladesh Shilpakala Academy, Dhaka, Bangladesh
1984 : Gallery de l'Agence, Paris, France
1985 : Gallery Nationale, Dakar, Senegal
       Bangla Academy, Dhaka, Bangladesh
1986 : Bangladesh Shilpakala Academy, Dhaka, Bangladesh
       Alliance Française, Dhaka, Bangladesh
1987 : Gallery Pierre Parrat, Paris, France
       Gallery Carlier, Le Touquet, France
1988 : Gallery Pierre Cardin, Cannes, France
       Gallery Contraste, Lille, France
1989 : Gallery Carlier, Le Touquet, France
       Gallery Centrast, Brussels, Belgium
       Gallery Pierre Parrat, Paris, France
       Gallery Gabrielle Fliegans, Strasbourg, France
       Bangladesh National Museum, Dhaka, Bangladesh
1990 : Espace d'Art Contemporain, Quimper, France
       Gallery Gabrielle Fliegans, Monaco, France
       Gallery des Carmes, Rouen, France
       Gallery Marie Thérèse Wagner, Thionville, France
       Cultural Centre, Bourg-en-Bresse, France
       Gallery Atelier 80, Bordeaux, France
1991: Gallery Samagra, Paris, France
      Gallery Arbitraire, Dôle (Jura) France
      Gallery Evelyne Guichard, Aoste, Italy
1992 : Ethnic Art Gallery, Switzerland
1993 : Gallery Samagra, Paris, France
       Bangladesh Shilpakala Academy, Dhaka, Bangladesh
       Gallery Atelier 80, Bordeaux, France
       Gallery Pyramide Pernod, Créteil, France
1994 : Birla Academy of Fine Arts and Culture, Kolkata, India
       Vadhera Art Gallery, Delhi, India
1995 : Shilpangan, Contemporary Art Gallery, Dhaka, Bangladesh
       "Portrait de Gandhi" Gallery Mohanjeet Grewal, Paris, France
1996 : Gallery Brûlée, Strasbourg, France
       " A return to India" Ashutosh Gallery, Kolkata, India
       Gallery Samagra, Paris, France
1997 : Gallery Epoke, Copenhagen, Denmark
1998 : Gallery Arbitraire, Dôle (Jura) France
       Gallery Mohanjeet Grewal, Mohanjeet Grewal, Paris, France
1999 : Gallery "Arts Vivendi" Munich, Germany
       Yazienki Krolenskie Museum, Varsovie, Poland
       Contemporary Art Center Spezia, La Spezia, Italy
2000 : "The Harmony Show" Nehru Center, Mumbai, India
2000 : Gallery Jacob-1, Paris, France
       Shilpangan, Contemporary Art Gallery, Dhaka, Bangladesh
2001 : Gallery Jacob-1, Paris, France
       Gallery Jas de la Rimade, Carcès, France
2002 : Gallery Raymond Joseph, Aix en Provence, France
2003 : India Habiart Center, Delhi, India
2004 : Gallery du Fleuve, Paris, France
       Gallery Bouchindhomme, Lille, France
       "Les dîners de l'Art Contemporain" Europe Zen Factory, Paris, France
       El Almundin Museum, Valence, Spain
       Gallery de Arte Contemporaneo Jorge Ontiveros, Alicante, Spain
2005 : Gallery Lazoukine, Deauville, France
       Foundation Jaime II "El Just" Monastere Royal de Santa-Maria de Valdigna, Valence, Spain
2006 : Contemporary Art Museum of Elche, Elche, Spain
       Gallery Bouchindhomme, Lille, France
2006–2008 : Three exhibitions Gallery Daniel Besseiche, Paris, France
2007 : Indian Contemporary Art Institute, Mumbai, India
       Gallery Lazoukine, Deauville, France
2008 : Ganges Art Gallery, Kolkata, India
2009 : La Salle Cai-Luzan, Zaragoza, Spain
       "Joy Bangla" Bengal Gallery of Fine Arts, Dhaka, Bangladesh
       Maison des Arts de Châtillon, Châtillon, France
2011 : Ganges Art Gallery, Kolkata, India
2012 : Gallery Lazoukine, Deauville, France
       Bangladesh National Museum, Dhaka, Bangladesh
       Gallery Daniel Besseiche, Paris, France
       Gallery Daniel Besseiche, Geneva, Switzerland
2013 : Gallery Jas de la Rimade, Carcès, France
       Gallery 21, Dhaka, Bangladesh
       Gallery Chitrak, Dhaka, Bangladesh
2014 : Gallery Brûlée, Strasbourg, France

Major group exhibitions
1974 : Silver Jubilee Commemorative show, College of Arts & Crafts, Dhaka, Bangladesh
1977 : FIAP Art Gallery, Paris, France
1979 : Exhibitions of Painters from 31 countries UNESCO, Paris, France
1981 : International Students Painting exhibition, CROUS, Paris, France
1982 : Young Artists exhibition, Bangladesh Shilpakala Academy, Dhaka, Bangladesh
1983 : Second Asian Art Biennal Bangladesh Shilpakala Academy, Dhaka, Bangladesh
1985 : Contemporary Art of Bangladesh, Kuala Lampur, Malaysia
1986 : Gallery Pierre Parrat, Paris, France
Gallery Carlier, Le Touquet, France
1988 : Olympiad of Arts, Seoul, South Korea
Contemporary Art of Bangladesh, Beijing, China
1989 : Museum of Contemporary Art, Taishung, Tawain
Colour of Life, Paris, France
Salon des Arts Contemporains, Paris, France
Museum of Bourg-en-Bresse, France
Gallery Contraste, Brussels, Belgium
1990 : Gallery Pluriels, Deauville, France
Espace Belleville d'Art Contemporain, Paris, France
1991 : Gallery Atelier 80, Bordeaux, France
1992 : Olympiad of Arts "50 Master Painters of Contemporary Art" Barcelona, Spain
African Art Biennal, Dakar, Senegal
1995 : "Bombay" Jahangir Art Gallery, Mumbai, India
1996 : L'Art du Marché, Saint-Cloud, France
"The Harmony show"Nehru Centre, Mumbai, India
Gallery Clemengis, Châlons-en-Champagne, France
Gallery Barbara Moran, Massachusetts, US
1997 : "The Harmony show"Nehru Centre, Mumbai, India
1999 : Contemporary Art Center Spezia, La Spezia, Italy
Cigares de la Havane, Society Tabacalara & Club Epicur de fumeurs de cigares, Cuba
2000 : Gallery Brûlée, Strasbourg, France
Cigares de la Havane, Gallery Flake, Paris, France
2001 : Espace Belleville drawing exhibition, Paris, France
2002 : Seoul Art Centre, Seoul, South Korea
Maison des Arts de Châtillon, Châtillon, France
2008 : Contemporary Bangladesh Art Week, New York City
Bengal Gallery of Fine Arts, Dhaka, Bangladesh
2013 : Ganges Art Gallery, India Art Fair, New Delhi
2014 : Ganges Arts Gallery, India Art Fair, New Delhi
Dhaka Art Summit, Dhaka, Bangladesh
2015 : Ganges Art Gallery, India Art Fair, New Delhi

References

Further reading
Ahmed, Faruque. Bengali journals and journalism in the United Kingdom: 1916–2007. London, UK: Ethnic Minorities Original History and Research Centre, 2008. Print.
Art and Asia Pacific Almanac. Vol. 5. New York: Art AsiaPacific Pub., 2010. Print. 
Asher, Frederick M. Art of India: prehistory to the present. New Delhi: Encyclopædia Britannica, 2003. Print.
Denson, G. Roger., and Thomas McEvilley. Capacity: the history, the world and the self in contemporary art and criticism. Amsterdam: Gordon & Breach, 1996. Print.
Selim, Lala Rukh. Art and crafts. Dhaka: Asiatic Soc. of Bangladesh, 2007. Print.
Sinclair, Susan, C. H. Bleaney, and Pablo García Suárez. Bibliography of art and architecture in the Islamic world. Vol. 2. Leiden: Brill, 2012. Print.

External links 

1950 births
Living people
People from Narsingdi District
Bangladeshi painters
University of Dhaka alumni
École des Beaux-Arts alumni
Recipients of the Independence Day Award
Chevaliers of the Ordre des Arts et des Lettres